George Canning (1770–1827) was Prime Minister of the United Kingdom.

George Canning may also refer to:

George Canning (writer) (–1771), Irish writer and father of the prime minister
George Canning, 1st Baron Garvagh (1778–1840), Anglo-Irish Member of Parliament
George Canning (athlete) (1889–1955), British athlete